The 6th Parliament of Upper Canada was opened 27 July 1812.  Elections in Upper Canada had been held in June 1812.  All sessions were held at York, Upper Canada.

The first Parliament buildings (located at the intersection of Front and Parliament Streets) were destroyed by fire on 27 April 1813, as a consequence of an American attack on the city during the War of 1812. The House of Assembly then met once in 1814 in the ballroom of Jordan's York Hotel.  The House then moved to the home of Chief Justice of Upper Canada William Henry Draper. This parliament was dissolved 18 April 1816.

This House of Assembly of the 6th Parliament of Upper Canada had five sessions 27 July 1812 to 1 April 1816:

See also
Legislative Council of Upper Canada
Executive Council of Upper Canada
Legislative Assembly of Upper Canada
Lieutenant Governors of Upper Canada, 1791-1841
Historical federal electoral districts of Canada
List of Ontario provincial electoral districts

References

Further reading 
Handbook of Upper Canadian Chronology, Frederick H. Armstrong, Toronto : Dundurn Press, 1985. 

06
1812 establishments in Upper Canada
1816 disestablishments in Upper Canada